Read House may refer to:

Read House & Gardens, New Castle, Delaware, operated by Delaware Historical Society
Cheney Read House, Cambridge, Massachusetts, listed on the National Register of Historic Places (NRHP)
Nathan Read House, Fall River, Massachusetts, NRHP-listed
Jones-Read-Touvelle House, Wauseon, Ohio, NRHP-listed
The Read House Hotel, Chattanooga, TN, listed on the NRHP in Hamilton County, Tennessee
Rastus-Read House, Lufkin, Texas, listed on the NRHP in Angelina County, Texas

See also
Read School (disambiguation)